Massaquoi is a surname. Notable people with the surname include:
Alloysious Massaquoi, Liberian-Scottish musician in the band Young Fathers
Fatima Massaquoi (1912-1978), Liberian writer
Hans Massaquoi (1926–2013), American journalist and writer
Jonathan Massaquoi (born 1988), American football player
Lamin Massaquoi (born 1978), Sierra Leonean footballer
Mohamed Massaquoi (born 1986), American football player
Momulu Massaquoi (1869-1938), Liberian diplomat
Nathaniel Varney Massaquoi (1905-1962), Liberian doctor
Roland Massaquoi, Liberian politician
Tim Massaquoi (born 1982), American football player